Nicole "Nikki" Ziegelmeyer (born September 24, 1975) is an American short track speed skater who competed in the 1992 Winter Olympics and 1994 Winter Olympics.

She was born in Imperial, Missouri and is a 1993 graduate of Windsor Senior High becoming a Hall of Fame inductee in 2006.

She was a member of the American relay team in the 1992 Olympics in Albertville, France, which won the silver medal in the 3000 metre relay competition.

Two years later she won the bronze medal with the American team in the 3000 metre relay event.

Ziegelmeyer planned to compete for the 1998 Winter Olympic Games in Nagano, Japan but suffered a severe break to her back when she fell to the ice and skidded into the boards at 35 mph during a training session in Lake Placid, New York in 1997.  Doctors weren't optimistic that she would ever walk again, but she recovered enough to walk eight weeks after surgery.  She decided upon a broadcasting career but started her own residential and commercial painting company, Elite Painting Inc., instead.  She attempted a comeback for the 2002 Winter Olympics Games in Salt Lake City, Utah in July 2000, but retired again on the day before she was to report to training camp. She ran her painting business for nine years and now owns Casa Di Vino wine bar in Imperial.

References

External links
 

1975 births
Living people
American female short track speed skaters
Short track speed skaters at the 1992 Winter Olympics
Short track speed skaters at the 1994 Winter Olympics
Olympic silver medalists for the United States in short track speed skating
Olympic bronze medalists for the United States in short track speed skating
American female speed skaters
Medalists at the 1992 Winter Olympics
Medalists at the 1994 Winter Olympics
21st-century American women